Pietz is a surname. Notable people with the surname include:

Allan Pietz (1925–2021), Canadian politician
Amy Pietz (born 1969), American actress
William Pietz (born 1951), American historian and political activist

See also
Lietz
Piet (given name)